Bobicești is a commune in Olt County, Oltenia, Romania. It is composed of eight villages: Bechet, Belgun, Bobicești, Chintești, Comănești, Govora, Leotești and Mirila.

References

Communes in Olt County
Localities in Oltenia